Galeazzo Visconti may refer to a number of members of the Italian Visconti dynasty:
 Galeazzo I Visconti (1277–1328), lord of Milan from 1322 to 1327
 Galeazzo II Visconti (c.1320–1378), lord of Milan from 1349 to 1378
 Gian Galeazzo Visconti (1351–1402), lord of Milan from 1378 to 1402, becoming its first duke in 1395
 Galeazzo Visconti (envoy), in 1499, envoy for Ludovico Sforza, the Duke of Milan at the Treaty of Basel (1499)